The West Nottingham Meetinghouse, or Little Brick Meetinghouse, is a historic Friends meeting house located at Rising Sun, Cecil County, Maryland, United States. It is a brick one-story building built in 1811, rectangularly shaped, and measuring 45 feet, 4 inches by 30 feet. Also on the property is a graveyard. The structure features two entrances, one for women and one for men, and sliding panels to divide the interior space in half, as well as the raised "Elder's Benches."

The West Nottingham Meetinghouse was listed on the National Register of Historic Places in 1976.

References

External links
, including undated photo, at Maryland Historical Trust

Quaker meeting houses in Maryland
Churches in Cecil County, Maryland
Churches on the National Register of Historic Places in Maryland
Churches completed in 1811
19th-century Quaker meeting houses
National Register of Historic Places in Cecil County, Maryland